Hertha (minor planet designation: 135 Hertha) is an asteroid from the inner region of the asteroid belt, approximately  in diameter. Discovered on 18 February 1874 by German–American astronomer Christian Peters at the Litchfield Observatory near Clinton, New York, it was named after the Teutonic and Scandinavian goddess of fertility, Hertha, also known as Nerthus. It orbits among the Nysa asteroid family, but its classification as a metallic M-type asteroid does not match the more common F-type asteroid for this family, suggesting that it may be an interloper. Spectroscopic analysis indicates the possible presence of hydrated silicates indicating that Hertha should possibly be reclassified from its present M-type to the proposed W-type.

Lightcurve data from Hertha indicates a flattened body, and radar observations indicate that Hertha is non-metallic. Five occultations of stars by the asteroid have been observed between 2000 and 2015.

Discovery 
Hertha was discovered by C. H. F. Peters on 18 February 1874, in Clinton, New York.  Further observations were carried out in 1883 by W. T. Sampson and communicated to Astronomische Nachrichten on his behalf by Rear Admiral R. W. Shufeldt.

Physical properties 
After its discovery in 1874, subsequent observations in 1884 established Hertha orbit. Astronomers then began investigation of its physical properties.  As early as 1904, G. W. Hill reported observations of Hertha brightness indicating a variation of half a magnitude and a short period.

In October 1992 Dotto et al. performed 20 hours of observations spread over 6 nights to investigate Hertha rotational period, approximate shape, and the coordinates of its rotational axis.  They were able to confirm a rotational period of 8.398 ± .001 hours as previously measured by Harris et al. published earlier in 1992.  In the same study, Dotto et al. measured the asteroid's shape and rotational axis.  The axes' ratios were found to be: a/b = 1.34 ± .03 and b/c = 1.22 ± .05.  Two possible values were determined for the rotational axis, however further measurements at different ecliptic longitudes are required to determine which is correct.

In August 2003 Torppa et al. published their results on the shape and rotational properties of a number of asteroids, including Hertha.  Utilizing data from 42 lightcurves of Hertha spanning from 1978 to 2002, a more refined set of axes' ratios was obtained and a detailed shape model was obtained through inversion.  New values for the axes' ratios are: a/b = 1.1 and b/c = 1.5.  Measurements of the pole direction were also obtained, however like Dotto et al. they were unable to differentiate between their two possible solutions of (β=+58°, λ=96°) and (β=+53°, λ=274°).

In 2017, Hanuš et al. confirmed that the correct solution is β=°, λ=°. They also calculated the first non-convex shape model, based on lightcurve and stellar occultation data.

Spectral classification 
Although Hertha has long been classified as an M-type asteroid based on its spectral properties, observations carried out by Rivkin et al. in 1996 using the IRTF at Mauna Kea Observatory have raised the possibility of reclassification.  The presence of a dip in the observed spectrum at 3 μm indicates that the surface is hydrated, suggesting that Hertha should be reclassified as a W-type (a "wet M-type") asteroid.  Based on work carried out by Salisbury and Walter, the Rivkin study estimated the water content of the asteroid to be between 0.14 and 0.27 percent by mass. This estimate is based on laboratory measurements and may not be applicable to asteroids in space.

A more recent study by Rivkin et al. published in 2002 examined the dependence of spectral absorption on the asteroid's rotational phase.  The study looked at the 0.7 μm band, which is also associated with hydrated silicates, and found that the reflectance changes as the asteroid rotates, suggesting that the surface is heterogeneous with some hydrated areas intermixed with dry areas.

Asteroid family 
Hertha is one of the core members of the Nysa family (405) also known as Herta family. The Nysa–Polana complex is the main-belt's largest grouping of asteroids with nearly 20,000 members.

Further reading

References

External links 
 Lightcurve plot of 135 Hertha, Palmer Divide Observatory, B. D. Warner (2008)
 2008-Dec-11 Occultation / (2008 Asteroidal Occultation Results for North America)
 Asteroid Lightcurve Database (LCDB), query form (info )
 Dictionary of Minor Planet Names, Google books
 Asteroids and comets rotation curves, CdR – Observatoire de Genève, Raoul Behrend
 Discovery Circumstances: Numbered Minor Planets (1)-(5000) – Minor Planet Center
 
 

000135
Discoveries by Christian Peters
Named minor planets
000135
000135
000135
18740218